Palaestina is a genus of ant spiders first described by Octavius Pickard-Cambridge in 1872.  it contains only three species:

Palaestina dentifera O. Pickard-Cambridge, 1872 — Israel
Palaestina eremica Levy, 1992 — Egypt
Palaestina expolita O. Pickard-Cambridge, 1872 — Greece, Turkey, Israel, Lebanon

References

Zodariidae
Araneomorphae genera